Ceroplesis harrisoni is a species of beetle in the family Cerambycidae. It was described by Karl Jordan in 1895. It is known from the Central African Republic, Cameroon, and the Democratic Republic of the Congo.

References

harrisoni
Beetles described in 1895